Hyun-jin, also spelled Hyeon-jin or Hyon-jin, is a Korean unisex given name. Its meaning depends on the hanja used to write each syllable of the name. There are 35 hanja with the reading "hyun" and 43 hanja with the reading "jin" on the South Korean government's official list of hanja which may be registered for use in given names.

People with this name include:

Sportspeople
Lee Hyun-jin (footballer) (born 1984), South Korean male football winger and striker (K-League)
Ryu Hyun-jin (born 1985), South Korean male baseball pitcher
Yong Jae-hyun (born Yong Hyun-jin, 1988), South Korean male football player
Sim Hyon-jin (born 1991), North Korean male football left back and left midfielder

Television, film, and music
Bae Hyun-jin (born 1983), South Korean female television anchor
Kim Ha-eun (born Kim Hyun-jin, 1984), South Korean actress
Lee Hyun-jin (actor) (born 1985), South Korean actor
Seo Hyun-jin (born 1985), South Korean singer and actress
Kim Hyun-jin (born 1996), South Korean actor and model

Other
Simon Ok Hyun-jin (born 1968), South Korean Roman Catholic priest, Auxiliary Bishop of the Archdiocese of Gwangju
Hyun Jin Moon (born 1969), South Korean-born American businessman, son of Unification Church leader Sun-Myung Moon

See also
List of Korean given names

References

Korean unisex given names